Lawrence Elion (November 5, 1917 – March 27, 2011) was a Canadian / British actor who was best known for his role as the hapless first victim Stanley in David Winning's debut feature film Storm.

Lawrence was born in Brentford, Chiswick, England. He served in the Signal Corps of the British Army during World War II. Lawrence had a passion for music (piano) and the theatre, was a member of ACTRA and won numerous awards for 'Best Actor'.

His wife Isabel lives in Calgary, Alberta.

Selected filmography as actor
Storm (1987) .... Stanley
... aka Turbulences (Canada: French title)
I Miss You, Hugs and Kisses (1978) (TV) .... Alliston
Recommendation for Mercy (1975) .... Actor

External links

1917 births
2011 deaths
Canadian male film actors
Male actors from Calgary
British Army personnel of World War II
Royal Corps of Signals soldiers
British emigrants to Canada